Mifflin County is a county in the Commonwealth of Pennsylvania. As of the 2020 census, the population was 46,143. Its county seat is Lewistown. The county was created on September 19, 1789, from parts of Cumberland County and Northumberland County. It was named for Thomas Mifflin, the first Governor of Pennsylvania. Mifflin County comprises the Lewistown, PA Micropolitan Statistical Area.

Geography

The county terrain is formed by the folded Appalachian Mountain ridges which run from southwest to northeast across the county. The terrain slopes to the northeast, with its highest point (Broad Mtn) 1.25 mile (2 km) East Northeast from the county's Northwest corner, just south of the county's border with Centre County. It measures 2,339' (713m) Above sea level. The Juniata River flows northeast through the lower part of the county, exiting northeastward into Juniata County near Hawstone.

Mifflin County is located in, and has its boundaries defined by, the Ridge-and Valley Appalachian Mountains of Pennsylvania. US Route 322, a major divided highway, connects the county to the rest of the state on its route between Harrisburg and State College. US Route 522 also connects the county to the rest of the state on its route between Selinsgrove and Mount Union.

The county has a humid continental climate (Dfa/Dfb) and average temperatures in downtown Lewistown range from 27.8 °F in January to 72.7 °F in July.

Adjacent counties

 Centre County - north
 Union County - northeast
 Snyder County - east
 Juniata County - south
 Huntingdon County - west

Major highways

Protected areas

 Reeds Gap State Park
 Bald Eagle State Forest (part)
 Rothrock State Forest (part)
 Tuscarora State Forest (part)
 State Game Lands Number 107 (part)
 State Game Lands Number 112B (part)
 White Mountain Wild Area (part of Bald Eagle State Forest)

Demographics

2010 census
As of the 2010 U.S. census, there were 46,682 people and 18,743 households in the county. The population density was 113.6/sqmi (43.9/km2). There were 21,537 housing units at an average density of 52.4/sqmi (20.2/km2). The racial makeup of the county was 97.53% White, 0.64% Black or African American, 0.11% Native American, 0.36% Asian, 0.01% Pacific Islander, 0.31% from other races, and 1.03% from two or more races. 1.14% of the population were Hispanic or Latino of any race. 38.8% were of German, 19.2% American, 8.0% Irish and 7.5% English ancestry. 5.7% report speaking Pennsylvania Dutch, Dutch, or German at home.

There were 18,743 households, out of which 29.1% had children under the age of 18 living with them, 57.60% were married couples living together, 8.50% had a female householder with no husband present, and 29.90% were non-families. 26.00% of all households were made up of individuals, and 13.20% had someone living alone who was 65 years of age or older. The average household size was 2.49 and the average family size was 2.99.

The county population contained 23.1% under the age of 18, 2.2% from 18 to 19, 5.1% from 20 to 24, 10.4% from 25 to 34, 20.1% from 35 to 49, 20.6% from 50 to 64, and 18.5% who were 65 years of age or older. The median age was 39 years. The population was 48.93% male, and 51.07% female.

2020 Census

Amish community
The Amish community in Mifflin County, established in 1791, had a total population of 3,905 people (in 30 congregations) in 2017, or 8.5% of the county's population.

Dialect
The dominant form of speech in Mifflin County is the Central Pennsylvania accent. Almost everyone in Mifflin County speaks English. The Amish and some Mennonites speak Pennsylvania German, also known as Pennsylvania Dutch, a West Central German dialect, which is quite different from modern Standard German. The Amish and Mennonites also can speak English. Few non-Amish or Mennonites in Mifflin County today speak Pennsylvania German, but this was not true in the past.

Micropolitan Statistical Area

The United States Office of Management and Budget has designated Mifflin County as the Lewistown, PA Micropolitan Statistical Area (µSA). As of the 2010 United States Census the micropolitan area ranked 10th most populous in the State of Pennsylvania and the 237th most populous in the United States with a population of 46,682.

Law and government

County commissioners
Mark Sunderland (R)
Rob Postal (R)
Kevin P. Kodish (D)

State representatives
 Rich Irvin, Republican, Pennsylvania's 81st Representative District
 John D. Hershey, Republican, Pennsylvania's 82nd Representative District
 Kerry A. Benninghoff, Republican, Pennsylvania's 171st Representative District
(as of 9 May 2017)

State senator
 Jake Corman, Republican, Pennsylvania's 34th Senatorial District
(as of 9 May 2017)

United States representative
 Fred Keller, Republican, Pennsylvania's 12th congressional district

United States senators
 Pat Toomey, Republican
 Bob Casey, Jr., Democrat

Mifflin County voters have been reliably Republican. In only one national election since 1940 has the county selected the Democratic Party candidate.

|}

Economy
Major employers in Mifflin County include:

 Philips
 Lewistown Hospital
 Standard Steel
 Trinity Packaging Supply
 Overhead Door Corporation
 Jarden Plastics
 Marlette Homes
 Asher’s Chocolates (Formerly Goss Candies)
 Giant Food
 Walmart
 Lowe’s
 Mifflin County School District
 First Quality

Education

Public school districts
Most of the county is served by the Mifflin County School District, with the exception of Wayne Township and the boroughs of Newton-Hamilton and Kistler, which are part of the Mount Union Area School District.
 Mifflin County School District
 Mount Union Area School District (also in Huntingdon County)

Head Start preschool programs
Head Start is a federally and state funded preschool program for low income children. The program serves 3- and 4-year-olds. In order to participate the family income must be below federal poverty guidelines.
 Coleman Head Start Center
 McVeytown Head Start Center

Private schools
 Sacred Heart provides a private, Catholic education from kindergarten through fifth grade.
 Belleville Mennonite School, Beth-El Christian Day School, and Valley View Christian School provide Mennonite education through grade twelve.
 Mifflin County Christian Academy located in Decatur Township provides Christian education from kindergarten through grade twelve as well as day care.
 Several Old Order Amish schools provide education through grade eight.

Colleges and universities
Mifflin County Academy of Science and Technology located in Lewistown provides post high school degrees in nursing, auto mechanics and electrical services and other technology driven careers.

The Lewistown branch of the South Hills School of Business and Technology offers associate degrees and other certifications in various areas of business, technology, and some health care. (Closed 2019)

The Penn State Learning Center in Lewistown offers both two-year and four-year degrees. Recently, the Learning Center opened a state-of-the-art science lab to be used by students attending the Lewistown Hospital School of Nursing.

Media

Radio stations

AM
 WLUI 670 AM- Lewistown (simulcast on W225CK, 92.9 FM)
 WKVA 920 AM- Lewistown (simulcast on W262DO, 100.3 FM)

FM
 WRYV 88.7- Milroy
 WJRC 90.9- Lewistown
 WMRF 95.7- Lewistown
 WVNW 96.7- Burnham
 WCHX 105.5- Burnham

Television
Mifflin County does not have a local television station but it is provided with local coverage from the following stations outside of the county from both the Harrisburg and Johnstown/Altoona markets:

 WHTM 27 Harrisburg (27.1 ABC, 27.2 ION, 27.3 GetTV, 27.4 Laff)
 WPMT 43 York (43.1 FOX, 43.2 AntennaTV)
 WHP 21 Harrisburg (21.1 CBS, 21.2 MyNetworkTV, 21.3 CW)
 WGAL 8 Lancaster (8.1 NBC, 8.2 MeTV)
 WTAJ 10 Altoona (10.1 CBS, 10.2 Escape, 10.3 Laff, 10.4 Grit)
 WJAC 6 Johnstown (6.1 NBC, 6.2 MeTV, 6.3 Comet, 6.4 CW)
 WATM 23 Altoona (23.1 ABC, 23.2 FOX, 23.3 ThisTV, 23.4 AntennaTV)
 WWCP 8 Johnstown (8.1 FOX, 8.2 ABC)
 WHVL 29 State College (29.1 MyNetworkTV, 29.2 Buzzr)

Newspapers
 Lewistown Sentinel
 County Observer
 The Valley Newspaper

Communities

Under Pennsylvania law, there are four types of incorporated municipalities: cities, boroughs, townships, and, in at most two cases, towns.

Boroughs

 Burnham
 Juniata Terrace
 Kistler
 Lewistown (county seat)
 McVeytown
 Newton Hamilton

Census-designated places and unincorporated communities
Census-designated places are geographical areas designated by the US Census Bureau for the purpose of compiling demographic data. They are not actual jurisdictions under Pennsylvania law. Other unincorporated communities are listed here as well.

 Alfarata
 Allensville
 Anderson
 Atkinson Mills
 Barrville
 Belleville
 Belltown
 Cedar Crest
 Church Hill
 Granville
 Hawstone
 Highland Park
 Little Kansas
 Longfellow
 Lumber City
 Maitland
 Mattawana
 Menno
 Milroy
 Naginey
 Potlicker Flats
 Reedsville
 Ryde
 Shindle
 Siglerville
 Strodes Mills
 Union Mills
 Wagner
 Woodland
 Yeagertown

Townships

 Armagh
 Bratton
 Brown
 Decatur
 Derry
 Granville
 Menno
 Oliver
 Union
 Wayne

Population ranking
The population ranking of the following table is based on the 2010 census of Mifflin County.

† county seat

See also
 National Register of Historic Places listings in Mifflin County, Pennsylvania

References

Further reading
 Raymond Martin Bell, Mifflin County, Pennsylvania: Families and Records before 1800. Washington PA (1987)
 Raymond Martin Bell, Mifflin County, Pennsylvania, in the Revolution, 1775-1783. Washington PA (1993)
 Raymond Martin Bell, The Houses of Mifflin County, Pennsylvania. Washington PA (1970)
 Forest K Fisher, Mifflin County. Charleston SC: Arcadia Publishing (2008)
 I. Daniel Rupp, History of Mifflin County, Pennsylvania. Laughlintown PA: Southwest Pennsylvania Genealogical Services, n.d. [1983].
 John Martin Stroup, The Amish of the Kishacoquillas Valley, Mifflin County, Pennsylvania: When Did They Come, and Why? What of the Future? Lewistown PA: Mifflin County Historical Society (1965)
 John Martin Stroup and Raymond Martin Bell, The Genesis of Mifflin County Pennsylvania: Its Aborigines, Explorers, Early Settlement and Development, Indian Wars and The Revolution, and Formation as a County. Lewistown PA: Mifflin County Historical Society (1957)
 John Martin Stroup and Raymond Martin Bell, The People of Mifflin County, Pennsylvania, 1755-1798: Pioneer Settlers and Defenders of the Frontier During the Revolution. Lewistown, PA: Mifflin County Historical Society (1973)
  John Martin Stroup and Raymond Martin Bell, The Pioneers of Mifflin County, Pennsylvania: Who's Who in the Early Records with an Account of the Growth of the County before 1790. Lewistown PA: Mifflin County Historical Society (1942)
 The Cemeteries of Mifflin County, Pennsylvania. Lewistown PA: Mifflin County Historical Society (1977)
 Two Hundred Years: A Chronological List of Events in the History of Mifflin County, Pennsylvania. Lewistown PA: Mifflin County Historical Society (1957)

External links
 Pennsylvania Department of Transportation, Bureau of Planning and Research, Geographic Information Division, "2005 General Highway Map of Juniata and Mifflin Counties". Note: shows boroughs, townships, roads, villages, some streams. URL accessed on April 5, 2006.
JuniataRiverValley.org Visitor Bureau

 
1789 establishments in Pennsylvania
Populated places established in 1789
Counties of Appalachia